James Edward Ruffin (July 24, 1893 – April 9, 1977) was a U.S. Representative from Missouri.

Born on a farm near Covington, Tennessee, Ruffin moved to Aurora, Missouri with his parents.
He graduated from Aurora High School in 1912 and from Drury College (Drury University), Springfield, Missouri, in 1916.  While in college he was a member of Phi Alpha Sigma, and later Lambda Chi Alpha.
He taught school at Nickerson (Kansas) College in 1917, before being commissioned a first lieutenant on November 27, 1917. He served in the Fifty-third Regiment, Pioneer Infantry, overseas with the First and Thirty-fifth Divisions, and was discharged on June 3, 1919.

In 1920, Ruffin graduated from the Cumberland School of Law at Cumberland University, Lebanon, Tennessee, in 1920.  He was admitted to the bar that same year and commenced practice in Springfield, Missouri. From 1926 to 1928, he served as assistant city attorney.

Ruffin was elected as a Democrat to the Seventy-third Congress.
He was unsuccessful in his bid for renomination to the Seventy-fourth Congress in 1934.

Ruffin was appointed special assistant to the United States Attorney General on May 9, 1935. Assigned to the criminal division of the Department of Justice, he served until August 1953.

He resumed the practice of law in Springfield, Missouri, where he died April 9, 1977.
Ruffin is interred in East Lawn Cemetery.

References

1893 births
1977 deaths
United States Army officers
Democratic Party members of the United States House of Representatives from Missouri
Drury University alumni
20th-century American politicians
People from Covington, Tennessee
People from Aurora, Missouri
People from Springfield, Missouri